Warner Oland (born Johan Verner Ölund; October 3, 1879 – August 6, 1938) was a Swedish-American actor. His career included time on Broadway and numerous film appearances. He is most remembered for playing several Chinese and Chinese-American characters: Dr. Fu Manchu, Henry Chang in Shanghai Express, and, most notably, Honolulu Police detective Lieutenant Charlie Chan in 16 films.

Early years
Oland was born in the village of Nyby, Bjurholm Municipality, Västerbotten County, Sweden. He claimed that his vaguely Asian appearance was due to possessing some Mongolian ancestry, though his known ancestry contains no indication that this was so. 

When he was 13, Oland's family emigrated to the United States, in November 1892, on board the S/S Thingvalla, which sailed from Christiania, Norway, to New York. After an initial stay in New York City, the family settled in New Britain, Connecticut. Educated in Boston, Oland spoke English and his native Swedish, and eventually translated some of the plays of August Strindberg.

As a young man, Oland pursued a career in theater, at first working on set design while developing his skills as a dramatic actor. In 1906, he was signed to tour the country with the troupe led by Russian-American actress Alla Nazimova (1879–1945). The following year, he met and married the playwright and portrait painter Edith Gardener Shearn (1872-1968). Shearn made an ideal partner for Oland. She mastered Swedish, helping him with the translation of Strindberg's works that they jointly published in book form in 1912.

Film career

Career beginnings
After several years in theater, including appearances on Broadway as Warner Oland, in 1912 he made his silent film debut in Pilgrim's Progress, a film based on the John Bunyan novel. As a result of his training as a Shakespearean actor and his easy adoption of a sinister look, he was much in demand as a villain and in ethnic roles. Over the next 15 years, he appeared in more than 30 films, including a major role in The Jazz Singer (1927), one of the first talkies produced.

Becoming a star
Oland's normal appearance fit the Hollywood expectation of caricatured Asianness of the time, despite his having no proven Asian ethnic background. Oland portrayed a variety of Asian characters in several movies before being offered the leading role in the 1929 film The Mysterious Dr. Fu Manchu.

A box office success, The Mysterious Dr. Fu Manchu made Oland a star, and during the next two years he portrayed the evil Dr. Fu Manchu in three more films (although the second one was purely a cameo appearance). Firmly locked into such roles, he was cast as Charlie Chan in the international detective mystery film Charlie Chan Carries On (1931) and then in director Josef von Sternberg's 1932 classic film Shanghai Express opposite Marlene Dietrich and Anna May Wong.
Oland played a werewolf, biting the protagonist, played by Henry Hull, in Werewolf of London (1935).

The Charlie Chan industry
The enormous worldwide box office success of his Charlie Chan film led to more, with Oland starring in 16 Chan films in total. The series, Jill Lepore later wrote, "kept Fox afloat" during the 1930s, while earning Oland $40,000 per movie. Oland took his role seriously, studying the Chinese language and calligraphy.

Final year and death
Despite his wealth and success, Oland suffered from alcoholism that severely affected his health and his 30-year marriage. In January 1938, he started filming Charlie Chan at the Ringside. However, a week into shooting, his erratic behavior culminated in his walking off the set, causing the film to be abandoned. After a spell in the hospital, he signed a new three-picture deal with Fox to continue playing Chan. 

During this period he was involved in a bitter divorce from his wife. He was forbidden, by court order, from traveling overseas or moving his assets abroad. Around this time, he was involved in a public incident when, having ordered his chauffeur to drive him to Mexico, he was observed during a rest stop sitting on the running board of his car throwing his shoes at onlookers. 

The divorce settlement, favoring his wife, was announced to the media on April 2, 1938.  The same day he left the US by ship, turning up in southern Europe, then proceeding to his native Sweden, where he stayed with an architect friend.  In Sweden, Oland contracted bronchial pneumonia, worsened by the apparent onset of emphysema from years of heavy cigarette smoking, and he died in a hospital in Stockholm, August 6, 1938, aged 58.

Following cremation in Sweden, his ashes were brought back to the United States by his ex-wife, for interment in the Southborough Rural Cemetery in Southborough, Massachusetts, a suburb of Boston, where the Olands had previously resided in a historic farmhouse.

Oland's last film, the unfinished Charlie Chan at the Ringside, was reworked, with Oland's scenes reshot with Peter Lorre, and was released as Mr. Moto's Gamble (1938). 

Oland is referenced anonymously in Paramahansa Yogananda's Autobiography of a Yogi, when they met on a train, a famous actor who was, at first, critical of Yogananda's eastern garb but the conversation soon evolved into an amicable philosophical discussion.

Filmography

Pilgrim's Progress (1912) as John Bunyon (film debut)
The Romance of Elaine (1915) 
Sin (1915) as Pietro
The Unfaithful Wife (1915) 
Destruction (1915) as Mr. Deleveau
The Fool's Revenge (1916) as Undetermined Secondary Role (uncredited)
The Reapers (1916) as James Shaw
The Eternal Sapho (1916) as H. Coudal
The Eternal Question (1916) as Pierre Felix
Beatrice Fairfax (1916) as Detective
The Rise of Susan (1916) as Sinclair La Salle
Beatrice Fairfax Episode 4: The Stone God (1916) as Detective in office
Patria (1917, Serial) as Baron Huroki
The Fatal Ring (1917, Serial) as Richard Carslake
The Cigarette Girl (1917) as Mr. Wilson
Convict 993 (1918) as Dan Mallory
The Naulahka (1918) as Maharajah
The Mysterious Client (1918) as Boris Norjunov
The Yellow Ticket (1918) as Baron Andrey
The Lightning Raider (1919, Serial) as Wu Fang
Mandarin's Gold (1919) as Li Hsun
The Twin Pawns (1919) as John Bent
The Avalanche (1919) as Nick Delano
The Witness for the Defense (1919) as Captain Ballantyne
The Third Eye (1920, Serial) as Curtis Steele / Malcolm Graw
The Phantom Foe (1920, Serial) as Uncle Leo Sealkirk
The Yellow Arm (1921) as Joel Bain
Hurricane Hutch (1921, serial) as Clifton Marlow
East Is West (1922) as Charley Yong
The Pride of Palomar (1922) as Okada
His Children's Children (1923) as Dr. Dahl
The Fighting American (1924) as Fu Shing
So This Is Marriage? (1924) as Mario Dorando
One Night in Rome (1924) as King David
Curlytop (1924) as Shanghai Dan
Riders of the Purple Sage (1925) as Lew Walters aka Judge Dyer
Don Q, Son of Zorro (1925) as The Archduke
Flower of Night (1925) as Luke Rand
The Winding Stair (1925) as Petras
Infatuation (1925) as Osman Pasha
Don Juan (1926) as Cesare Borgia
 The Mystery Club (1926) as Eli Sinsabaugh
The Marriage Clause (1926) as Max Ravenal
Twinkletoes (1926) as Roseleaf
Tell It to the Marines (1926) as Chinese Bandit Chief
Man of the Forest (1926) as Clint Beasley
When a Man Loves (1927) as André Lescaut
A Million Bid (1927) as Geoffrey Marsh
Old San Francisco (1927) as Chris Buckwell
What Happened to Father? (1927) as W. Bradberry, Father
The Jazz Singer (1927) as The Cantor
Sailor Izzy Murphy (1927) as The girl's father
Good Time Charley (1927) as Good Time Charley Keene
Stand and Deliver (1928) as Ghika - the Bandit Leader
Wheel of Chance (1928) as Mosher Turkeltaub
The Scarlet Lady (1928) as Zaneriff
Dream of Love (1928) as The Duke, Current Dicator
 The Faker (1929) as Hadrian (the faker)
Chinatown Nights (1929) as Boston Charley
The Studio Murder Mystery (1929) as Rupert Borka
The Mysterious Dr. Fu Manchu (1929) as Dr. Fu Manchu
The Mighty (1929) as Sterky
Dangerous Paradise (1930) as Schomberg
The Vagabond King (1930) as Thibault
Paramount on Parade (1930) as Fu Manchu (Murder Will Out)
The Return of Dr. Fu Manchu (1930) as Dr. Fu Manchu
The Drums of Jeopardy (1931) as Dr. Boris Karlov
Dishonored (1931) as Colonel von Hindau
Charlie Chan Carries On (1931) as Inspector Charlie Chan
The Black Camel (1931) as Inspector Charlie Chan
The Big Gamble (1931) as North
Daughter of the Dragon (1931) as Fu Manchu
Charlie Chan's Chance (1932) as Inspector Charlie Chan
Shanghai Express (1932) as Henry Chang
A Passport to Hell (1932) as Baron von Sydow, Police Commandant
The Son-Daughter (1932) as Fen Sha
Before Dawn (1933) as Dr. Paul Cornelius
Charlie Chan's Greatest Case (1933) as Inspector Charlie Chan
As Husbands Go (1934) as Hippolitus Lomi
Mandalay (1934) as Nick
Charlie Chan's Courage (1934) as Inspector Charlie Chan
Bulldog Drummond Strikes Back (1934) as Prince Achmed
Charlie Chan in London (1934) as Inspector Charlie Chan
The Painted Veil (1934) as General Yu
Charlie Chan in Paris (1935) as Inspector Charlie Chan
Werewolf of London (1935) as Dr. Yogami
Charlie Chan in Egypt (1935) as Inspector Charlie Chan
Shanghai (1935) as Ambassador Lun Sing
Charlie Chan in Shanghai (1935) as Inspector Charlie Chan
Charlie Chan's Secret (1936) as Inspector Charlie Chan
Charlie Chan at the Circus (1936) as Inspector Charlie Chan
Charlie Chan at the Race Track (1936) as Inspector Charlie Chan
Charlie Chan at the Opera (1936) as Inspector Charlie Chan
Charlie Chan at the Olympics (1937) as Inspector Charlie Chan
Charlie Chan on Broadway (1937) as Inspector Charlie Chan
Charlie Chan at Monte Carlo (1937) as Inspector Charlie Chan

References

Other sources
 
 
Huang, Yunte (2010) Charlie Chan: The Untold Story of the Honorable Detective and His Rendezvous with American History (New York: W W Norton)

External links

 Photographs and literature
 
 
 
  (as translator)
 
 
 

1879 births
1938 deaths
20th-century American male actors
20th Century Studios contract players
20th-century translators
Burials in Massachusetts
Deaths from emphysema
Deaths from pneumonia in Sweden
People from Bjurholm Municipality
People from Southborough, Massachusetts
Swedish emigrants to the United States
Swedish–English translators
Swedish male film actors
Swedish male stage actors